Akshay Kumar (born 1967) is an Indian actor.

Akshay Kumar may also refer to:

 Akshay Kumar Datta (1820–1886), Bengali writer
 Akshay Kumar Boral (1860–1919), Bengali poet and writer
 Akshay Kumar Maitreya (1861–1930), Bengali historian and social worker
 Akshay Kumar Sen (1854–1923), disciple of Sri Ramakrishna

See also
 Akshayakumara, son of Ravana featured in the Sanskrit epic poem Ramayana